Dehnow is a village in Dar Pahn Rural District, Senderk District, Minab County, Hormozgan Province, Iran. At the 2006 census, its population was 92, in 19 families.

References 

Populated places in Minab County